Chilhowee Gliderport  is a privately owned public-use glider airport located four nautical miles (5 mi, 7 km) northeast of the central business district of Benton, in Polk County, Tennessee, United States.

Historical 
The land that the gliderport is located on was once a farm that was owned by the late Polk County Executive (then County Judge) Dennis White. In 1973, White leased the land to Indiana-based promoter C.F. Manifest Inc. for a large music festival known as the Monster Peace Jubilee. The festival, nicknamed "Polkstock" due to its apparent resemblance to 1969's Woodstock, was planned to take place on Labor Day weekend of that year, and expected to attract around 500,000 people. The event was strongly opposed by locals, especially the religious community, who believed it would bring much of the perceived rock music culture of the time. The festival was eventually ruled by the state circuit court to constitute a public nuisance, due to drug, health, and traffic problems, and was prohibited, on the request of the district attorney. 

In 1973 Michael Reisman and other glider enthusiasts leased some farm property southwest of Benton and developed a gliderport and recreational flying field. Because the land was part of a farm called Chilhowee, the name became permanently attached to the airfield.

Facilities and aircraft 
Chilhowee Gliderport has one runway designated 3/21 with a turf surface measuring 2,600 by 200 feet (792 x 61 m).

For the 12-month period ending December 31, 2008, the airport had 10,820 aircraft operations, an average of 29 per day: 98% general aviation and 2% military. At that time there were 29 aircraft based at this airport: 90% glider and 10% single-engine.

Chilhowee Gliderport is nestled against the western foothills of the Great Smoky Mountains. Directly east of the 3,000-foot turf strip is Bean Mountain and Oswald Dome. Ridges along these mountains extend for more than 20 miles, providing near perfect wind currents and lift conditions for gliders.

References

External links 
 Aerial image as of 16 March 1997 from USGS The National Map

Airports in Tennessee
Buildings and structures in Polk County, Tennessee
Gliderports in the United States
Transportation in Polk County, Tennessee